Antonio Crispo (died after 1505) was a governor of the Duchy of the Archipelago between 1496 and 1505. He was the son of Giacomo Crispo.

He married NN and had a son: 
 William Crispo (or Guglielmo; - 1555), married to NN, and had a son:
 Antonio Crispo, Governor of the Duchy of the Archipelago

References
 

People from the Duchy of the Archipelago
Antonio 02
People from the Cyclades
Year of birth unknown
Year of death unknown